Nilanga(निलंगा) is a town with a municipal council in Latur District in the Indian state of Maharashtra. It is also the headquarters for Nilanga Taluka. The city being small is the Taluka Headquarter.

History of Nilanga 
Nilanga is located on the border with Andra Pradesh, it was under the Nizam regime until the Nizam territory merged with India.
Nizam of Hyderabad had appointed vatandars under the landlord system and had appointed vatandars one of  essentially managing  all administrative work and tax collection.
The Vatandars or essentially landlords were extremely rich people who had authority to manage the areas and ensure well being.
Until Nizam merged this territory in India.

Agriculture 
Nilanga is an agricultural town as a fact most of people in this town are in agriculture also it is one of the most drought affected districts in Maharashtra and also is one of  highest no of farmer suicides in Maharashtra.

Political importance 
This town is famous as it is hometown of former chief minister of Maharashtra.

Demographics 
 India census, Nilanga had a population of 36,112. Males constituted 52% of the population and females 48%. Literacy rate of Nilanga city is 80% lower than state average of 82.34%. In Nilanga, Male literacy is around 85.84% while female literacy rate is 73.71%. In 2011 in Nilanga, 13% of the population was under 6 years of age. The majority of the people of this town are engaged either in agriculture or traditional retail business. Muslim, Maratha and Lingayat, Yellam communities have dominated this town by their influence in business and politics. Being a part of Maharashtra's dry zone, Nilanga faces frequent Water Crisis. It ranks 11th Taluka in Maharashtra for Farmer Suicides.

Marathi is widely spoken in the region. Kannada and Hindi are also spoken by some in the town.

Schedule Caste (SC) constitutes 19.42% while Schedule Tribe (ST) were 1.98% of total population in Nilanga.

References 

Cities and towns in Latur district